St Mary's and All Saints' Church is an Anglican church in the village of Checkley, Staffordshire, England. It is a Grade I listed building. The oldest parts of the building are 12th-century, with later medieval and 17th-century work.

Description
The lower storey of the tower is 12th-century, the later upper part being in Perpendicular style. The south door, protected by a porch, is of about 1300.

The nave has four bays, and the clerestory windows above are 17th-century. The north arcade is 13th-century, and the round-arched north aisle windows are 17th-century. The south arcade is taller than the north arcade; although parts are of the 12th century, it was later remodelled. The pointed chancel arch is early 13th-century.

The chancel, of four bays, is late 13th-century; the pointed five-light east window and three-light side windows have intersecting tracery. The glass in the chancel is 14th-century.

The font is a cylindrical bowl on a shaft, both 12th-century. The bowl is decorated with low relief carvings: there is a Lamb of God on an altar, with panels around the bowl containing irregular patterns of triangles.

Anglo-Scandinavian stone crosses
In the churchyard, south of the church, are three early medieval stone crosses; they are close together and are thought to be standing in or near their original positions. There is a tradition that the crosses were erected in memory of three bishops killed in a battle near the village. They are regarded as among the finest Anglo-Scandinavian crosses in Staffordshire.

They each have a tapering, rectangular section, each being  part of a longer cross-shaft. The southern cross (height ) and central cross (height ) are decorated on all four sides; there are full-length human figures and plaitwork patterns, on panels separated on the southern cross with curved divisions, on the central cross with straight divisions. The northern cross (height ) is undecorated.

See also
 Grade I listed churches in Staffordshire

References

Church of England church buildings in Staffordshire
Grade I listed churches in Staffordshire
Diocese of Lichfield